Amzebek Rysbekuly Jolshybekov (born 7 March 1947) is a Kazakh politician, member of the Mazhilis from 1999 to 2012, parliamentary leader of Otan (party) from 2004 to 2006, and then Nur Otan from 2006 to 2007, Deputy Chairman of the CEC from 1991 to 1993 and the Secretary of the National Council from 2002 to 2003.

Biography
Jolshybekov was born in 1947 in the village of Tamdy in the Jambyl Region of Kazakh SSR. 

In 1970, he graduated from the Jambyl Technological Institute of Light and Food Industries. Jolshybekov was then the head of the workshop and the Deputy Director of the Berlik Bread Production Enterprise until 1973. That year, he became the First Secretary of the Chui District Komsomol Committee. From 1978, Jolshybekov worked in various government bodies in the Jambyl region. In 1989, he finished the Alma-Ata Higher Party School. After graduating, Jolshybekov was the Deputy Head of the Department of the Central Committee of the Communist Party of Kazakhstan until 1990 when he became the Secretary of the Jambyl Regional Committee of the Communist Party of Kazakhstan. 

From 1991 to 1993, Jolshybekov was the President of Tulpar Joint Stock Company in Jambyl. From 1993 to 1995, he became the head of the three districts in the Jambyl Region. In 1995, he became the State Inspector of the Administration of the President. From 1996 to 1997, Jolshybekov was the Deputy Chief of Staff of the Mazhilis.
From 1997 to 1998, he was the Head Secretary of the Supreme Disciplinary Council of Kazakhstan. In September 1998, Jolshybekov became the Deputy head organizational and control department of the Presidential Administration of the Republic of Kazakhstan. 

In October 1999, Jolshybekov was elected as member of the Mazhilis in the 1999 legislative election, representing the 31st district of the Jambyl Region. From November 2002, he chosen to be the Head of the Office of the Senate of Kazakhstan. In March 2004, he became the Head of the Department of the Presidential Administration until November of that year. On 19 September 2004, Jolshybekov became the parliamentary leader of the Otan faction in the Mazhilis. He was reelected in 2004 and remained a member and the parliamentary leader until 20 June 2007. Jolshybekov was reelected for a third term in 2007 until his retirement in 2012. From 2008 to 2009, Jolshybekov was the President of Mining and Metallurgical Concern Kazakhaltyn JSC.

References

1947 births
Members of the Mazhilis
People from Jambyl Region
Living people